Małgorzata Chojnacka may refer to:
 Małgorzata Chojnacka (canoeist)
 Małgorzata Chojnacka (gymnast)